Truncocolumella is a genus of fungi in the family Suillaceae, of the order Boletales. It was circumscribed by American mycologist Sanford Myron Zeller in 1939. One field guide lists the potato-like Truncocolumella citrina as edible.

References

Boletales
Boletales genera